Dal Millington Lemmon (October 29, 1887 – April 26, 1958) was a United States circuit judge of the United States Court of Appeals for the Ninth Circuit and previously was a United States district judge of the United States District Court for the Northern District of California.

Education and career

Born in Newton, Kansas, Lemmon received an Artium Baccalaureus degree from Stanford University in 1908. He was a law librarian for the California State Library from 1908 to 1910, and was in private practice in Sacramento, California from 1910 to 1933. He was a Judge of the Superior Court of Sacramento County, California from 1933 to 1947.

Federal judicial service

Lemmon was nominated by President Harry S Truman on January 17, 1947, to a seat on the United States District Court for the Northern District of California vacated by Judge Martin Ignatius Welsh. He was confirmed by the United States Senate on February 5, 1947, and received his commission on February 7, 1947. His service was terminated on May 3, 1954, due to elevation to the Ninth Circuit.

Lemmon was nominated by President Dwight D. Eisenhower on April 6, 1954, to the United States Court of Appeals for the Ninth Circuit, to a new seat created by 68 Stat. 871. He was confirmed by the Senate on April 27, 1954, and received commission on April 29, 1954. His service was terminated on April 26, 1958, due to his death.

References

Sources
 

1887 births
1958 deaths
Stanford University alumni
California state court judges
Judges of the United States District Court for the Northern District of California
United States district court judges appointed by Harry S. Truman
20th-century American judges
Judges of the United States Court of Appeals for the Ninth Circuit
United States court of appeals judges appointed by Dwight D. Eisenhower